Naam Karan is the name given to the Sikh child naming ceremony. It usually takes place at a Gurdwara, there is no strict time table for holding the ceremony, the health and well-being of the mother and child being considered most important in determining when it should take place.

Steps of the ceremony 
When the family performs this ceremony, the father or senior member of the family contact a local Gurdwara for the brief ceremony. On the day of the Naam Karan, the family, guests, mother and baby attend the weekly kirtan of the Saadh Sangat of the congregation. The family makes arrangements to have Karah Prasad said for the occasion. Various Shabads of thanks, joy, and support are sung followed by the short Anand Sahib (6 pauris). Then, if a Sahaj Paath has been arranged, the bhog of this reading takes place.

Then comes the main part of the ceremony, which is the naming of the baby. The ardas is done with a request to God to grant the child good health; make him or her a dedicated Sewadar of the country and Panth; to enlighten the name of his/her family and Dharma, and to ask for a name for the child.

The Ardas is followed by the Hukamnama. When the Hukamnama is taken, the first letter of the first word of the Hukam is the letter to be used to give the name to the child. So, for example, if the first word of the Hukam is "Sagal", the child's name should start with  "S" (i.e., the first letter).

Once the name for the baby has been chosen, the word "Kaur" is added to the names of girls and the name "Singh" is added to the names of boys. The gyani will pronounce the name of the child in the Sangat.

References

External links
 sgpc.net Rehat Maryada

Sikh terminology
Sikh practices